Apisai Naqalevu, or Apisai Naqaliva, (born 21 August 1989) is a Fijian rugby union and rugby sevens player who plays as a centre.

Biography 
He was born in the Naitasiri province, in the village of Botenaulu. He began playing rugby at the age of nine with the Muaira District School in Naitasiri. He represents the Suva team in the Digicel Cup that he won in 2012. He worked in his country as a police officer.

References 

1989 births
Living people
Fijian rugby union players
Rugby union wings
ASM Clermont Auvergne players
Rugby union centres
Fijian expatriate rugby union players
Expatriate rugby union players in France
Fijian expatriate sportspeople in France